Homage to Cabrillo: Venetian Quadrant is a 1985 metal sculpture by Eugene Sturman, installed in Los Angeles, California. The 33-foot bronze and stainless steel artwork was valued at $250,000 as of 1985.

The work was surveyed as part of the Smithsonian Institution's "Save Outdoor Sculpture!" program in 1994. The following description is used in the survey: " four main elements which form a quadrant, representing the four corners of the earth or four points of the celestial sphere, and two long conical shapes which encompass a time capsule."

References 

1985 establishments in California
1985 sculptures
Bronze sculptures in California
Outdoor sculptures in Greater Los Angeles
South Park (Downtown Los Angeles)
Stainless steel sculptures in the United States
Steel sculptures in California